Obodnik is a village in the municipality of Kotor Varoš, Republika Srpska in Bosnia and Herzegovina. This settlement is located at the mouth of Kruševica and Vigošća in Vrbanja  river (altitude 340 m). From this location Vrbanja valley expands into Večićko polje and the plateau around Vrbanjci. Highway M-4 runs through Obodnik. The road to Šiprage and Kruševo Brdo also runs from this village.

Population

References

Villages in Republika Srpska
Populated places in Kotor Varoš